Apteropeda globosa is a species of flea beetle in the family Chrysomelidae that can be found in Benelux, Ireland, Portugal, Romania, Slovakia, Slovenia, Austria, British Isles, Czech Republic, Denmark, France, Germany, northern Italy, southwestern Poland, Spain, and Western Ukraine. It is green coloured,

Habitat
The species feeds on various Lamiaceae and Veronica species.

References

Galerucinae
Beetles described in 1794
Beetles of Europe
Taxa named by Johann Karl Wilhelm Illiger